Saints Peter and Paul Basilica is a historic Roman Catholic church at 214 E. 8th Street in Chattanooga, Tennessee. It is one of the oldest continuing parishes in the Diocese of Knoxville.

Saints Peter and Paul Parish in Chattanooga was founded in January 1852. The small but growing Catholic community in Chattanooga would conduct Mass in numerous buildings through the parish's early years. One former building included a nearly completed stone church demolished by the occupying Union Army during the Battle of Chickamauga in 1863. The Army of the Cumberland under the command of Major General William Rosecrans used the stone from the church to construct fortifications and culverts in support of the Union Army. Under the leadership of Father William Walsh, an Irish priest, ground was broken on the current site on February 1, 1888. The current building was dedicated June 29, 1890. It was added to the National Register of Historic Places in 1979 as Saints Peter and Paul Catholic Church and Buildings.

Stained-glass windows in the basilica, designed by Louis Comfort Tiffany, depict significant events in the lives of the parish's patron saints. The life of Saint Peter is depicted in the east side windows and the life of Saint Paul in the west side. The basilica's walls are also adorned with 14 polychrome Stations of the Cross, whose scenes depict the suffering, death, and burial of Jesus Christ. The Kilgen organ in the church was built in 1936.

Saints Peter and Paul was raised to a minor basilica by Pope Benedict XVI and inaugurated by Bishop Richard Stika of the Diocese of Knoxville on October 22, 2011. Monsignor George E. Schmidt, Jr., who had served as pastor since 1986, became the basilica's first rector. He was among more than 30 sons of the parish who entered into the priesthood.

In 2016, the Roman Catholic Diocese of Knoxville began a cause of canonization of Father Patrick Ryan, who served as pastor of Saints Peter and Paul Parish from 1872 to 1878. He died from yellow fever on Sept. 28, 1878 at the age of 33. Father Ryan is described by an eyewitness as "going from house to house in the worst-infected section of the city to find what he could do for the sick and needy."

References

External links
 Official website

Roman Catholic churches in Tennessee
Churches on the National Register of Historic Places in Tennessee
Gothic Revival church buildings in Tennessee
Roman Catholic churches completed in 1890
Churches in Chattanooga, Tennessee
Peter and Paul, Chattanooga
National Register of Historic Places in Chattanooga, Tennessee
19th-century Roman Catholic church buildings in the United States